Kadangalathil Karunakaran Nayar or Kadangalathil Karuna Karan Nair (11 September 1907 — 7 September 1977) was an Indian politician who was a member of the Lok Sabha. He was elected to 4th Lok Sabha from Bahraich (Lok Sabha constituency) as a candidate of Bharatiya Jan Sangh. He was born in Alleppey in Kerala and studied at Madras University, Bara Seni College, Aligarh (Agra University) and University College, London. He joined Indian Civil Service in 1930 and served in various positions in Uttar Pradesh including Gonda (1946), Faizabad (1 June 1949 - 14 March 1950). He took voluntary retirement in 1952 and practised law at the Allahabad High Court.

References

1907 births
1977 deaths
20th-century Indian lawyers
India MPs 1967–1970
Indian civil servants
Politicians from Alappuzha
University of Madras alumni
Bharatiya Jana Sangh politicians
People from Bahraich district
Lok Sabha members from Uttar Pradesh